Sânpetru (German: Petersberg; Hungarian: Barcaszentpéter) is a commune in Brașov County, Transylvania, Romania, located just north of the county seat, Brașov. It is composed of a single village, Sânpetru.

The commune is located in the Burzenland ethnographic area, in the eastern part of the county, at the foot of the Carpathian Mountains.

This area was home to many Transylvanian Saxons, although after the Romanian Revolution of 1989 much of this community emigrated to Germany. The center of the village was built by this group and shows the influence of German architecture.  Separate from this there is a Romanian-built area featuring a small church and houses dating at least to the early 19th century. A new center was built closer to Brașov during the communist era to house migrating workers for the tractor and bus factories in the city. Since 1989, new, more luxurious houses have been built on the outskirts of the village, slowly linking it with Brașov.

Demographics
At the 2011 census, 91.8% of inhabitants were Romanians, 2.7% Hungarians and 1.7% each Germans and Roma.

Natives include Zaharia Bârsan (1878–1948), a playwright, poet, and actor and Reinhold Batschi (born 1942), a former Romanian rower and leading Australian rowing coach.

Churches
The landmark of the village is the 13th-century fortified church. The original 3-nave basilica was demolished in 1794. There are still a few traces of the original 13th-century paintings on the defensive walls that surrounded the church. The Order of Cistercians received it in 1240. The fortified church was severely destroyed during a Turkish invasion in 1432. Most of the village was also destroyed then. After the Ottoman invasion, the local community built an 8-meter-high defensive wall fortified with 5 towers and a water trench.

In the 17th century, the church suffered major damage in a large fire that also destroyed the local archives. The bell tower collapsed in 1713 and was rebuilt in 1778–82. This tower later collapsed, and in 1795 the structure was demolished and construction on a new church was begun.

Tourism
Sânpetru's main tourist attraction is the land around Lempes hill, a partially forested promontory which is a reservation for wild flora.  This is a habitat for certain vary rare flowers as well as various fruit-bearing plants such as strawberry, raspberry, blackberry, and blueberry. This preserve is home to a variety of fauna including  rabbits, snakes, lizards, and birds. Deer once made their home here but may have since been hunted to extinction. The ecology here is somewhat emperiled by the nearby presence of an artificial lake for depositing tar waste, herds of sheep. Paragliding enthusiasts use the hill as a launch point.

Fossils
This community is notable as the place where, in the late 19th century, Ilona von Felsö-Szilvás discovered fossilized dinosaur bones that had become exposed in a hillside on her the family’s estate which was at that time within the borders of Austria-Hungary.

Ilona and her brother, Baron Franz Nopcsa von Felsö-Szilvás, were intrigued by the discovery.  The bones were sent to the eminent Viennese geologist Eduard Suess for identification. Suess advised the Baron to identify the bones himself. As a result, the Baron enrolled at the University of Vienna and soon became one of the principal  paleobiological researchers in central Europe, and the founder of paleophysiology.

Ilona's initial discovery turned out to be a duck-billed dinosaur. Subsequently, the remains of an armoured dinosaur, a long-necked sauropod, a flying reptile of the Pterosauria type and several other dinosaurs were excavated from that same hill in Sânpetru.

References

Literature
 Arne Franke: Das wehrhafte Sachsenland – Kirchenburgen im südlichen Siebenbürgen, Deutsches Kulturforum Östliches Europa, Potsdam 2007  (online).

Communes in Brașov County
Localities in Transylvania
Burzenland